This event is not to be confused with the Dixie Bowl, another college football post-season game staged in Birmingham, Alabama in the 1940s.  For other uses, see Dixie Classic (disambiguation).

The Dixie Classic was a post-season college football bowl game played at Fair Park Stadium in Dallas, Texas, following the 1921, 1924, and 1933 seasons. It was phased out in favor of the Cotton Bowl Classic.  The 1922 game is famous for the beginning of the Texas A&M 12th man tradition.

Game results

See also
 List of college bowl games

References

External links
 Hog Database - 1934 Dixie Classic Summary Box Score and Recap from the final Dixie Classic

Defunct college football bowls